Guillaume Legras (born 17 January 1990 in France) is a French retired footballer.

Career

After failing to make an appearance for French Ligue 1 side Montpellier HSC, Legras was spotted by a scout from Italian second division club A.C. Reggina 1919 while playing at a tournament for out-of-contract players. Despite failing the trial, he eventually signed for A.S.D. Barletta 1922 in the Italian third division. In 2015, after the club went bankrupt, he trialed with Yeovil Town in England before joining another Italian third division team, U.C. AlbinoLeffe.

In 2017, Legras became a free agent again until he signed for French lower league outfit Blois Football 41 for the second half of 2017/18.

References

External links
 Guillaume Legras at Soccerway

French footballers
Living people
Association football midfielders
1990 births
FC Martigues players
U.C. AlbinoLeffe players
U.S. Vibonese Calcio players
Blois Football 41 players
A.S.D. Barletta 1922 players